is a Japanese zombie manga series written and illustrated by Kengo Hanazawa. It was serialized in Shogakukan's seinen manga magazine Weekly Big Comic Spirits from April 2009 to February 2017, with its chapters collected in 22 tankōbon volumes. In North America the manga has been licensed for English language release by Dark Horse Comics.

A live-action film adaptation premiered at the Sitges Film Festival in October 2015, before being released commercially in April 2016. There are three spin-off manga, set in the same universe, titled I Am a Hero in Osaka, I Am a Hero in Ibaraki and I Am a Hero in Nagasaki.

By November 2015, the manga had over 4 million copies in circulation. In 2013, I Am a Hero won the 58th Shogakukan Manga Award in the General category.

Plot

I Am a Hero
The story begins with Hideo Suzuki, a 35-year-old manga artist assistant, whose life seems to be stuck around his exhausting but low-paying job, unfulfilled dreams, strange hallucinations and unsatisfying relationships. He sees himself as a supporting character in his own life, and has low self-esteem, resulting in frustration.

One day, the world as Hideo knows it is shattered by the presence of a disease (nicknamed ZQN) that turns people into homicidal maniacs who resemble and behave like zombies, and whose first instinct is to attack and devour the nearest human. Armed with only his sporting shotgun, he runs for his life, meeting strangers along the way. For a while, he and his companions struggle to stay alive, while questioning their moral choices. In the end, only three of them remain and drive all the way to the top of Mt. Fuji to be saved.

I Am a Hero in Osaka 
I Am a Hero in Osaka is set at the beginning of the ZQN outbreak in Osaka. This manga is centered around a part-time manager named Tatsuo with a love for motorcycles and his gasoline-fueled journey to rescue his girlfriend Kozue, stranded on an airplane at Kansai International Airport, as well as Kozue's fight for survival in an increasingly hostile environment. Against sinking odds, the couple do their utmost to reunite with the other.

I Am a Hero in Ibaraki
I Am a Hero in Ibaraki is set at the beginning of the ZQN outbreak in Ibaraki. The focus of this story is about an isolated high-school student and his dog struggling to survive, not only against the ZQN, but also that of his infected family and childhood friends.

I Am a Hero in Nagasaki
I Am a Hero in Nagasaki is set at the beginning of the ZQN outbreak in Nagasaki. The manga consists of the story of Yamada, a high-school dropout turned photographer who suffers from vivid hallucinations brought upon by a form of Anthropophobia and Nirei Aya, a Kyūdō national champion and Yamada's former classmate. The story documents their journey to Hashima Island, a perceived place of safety. However, their journey will not only be threatened by simply the ZQN, but also from their fellow humans.

Characters
 Hideo Suzuki: A down-on-his-luck manga artist struggling to publish his own work while maintaining both a day job as another artist's assistant and a strained relationship with his girlfriend. Hideo is slightly paranoid and mentally disturbed, often having conversations with an imaginary figure named Yajima, hallucinating the presence of faces around him, and fantasizing about how conversations with his co-workers and girlfriend should proceed. Though he was bitten on the hand by his girlfriend, the bite did not break the skin and draw blood, narrowly avoiding infection. He seems to have gained the mysterious ability to manipulate the movements of the infected like a puppeteer. After Hiromi leaves, Hideo travels into the city and gets involved in a four-way standoff between himself, the Kurusu Cult, a group of survivors, and the giant creature that Hiromi joined with.
 Hayakari Hiromi: A teenage girl who is empathetic towards the undead, shown to apparently be able to kill them by giving them closure with their life. Later, she is infected but still retains most of her personality. Post infection, she loses all the superficial symptoms of the infected (protruding black veins, bloodshot eyes). She eventually has sex with Hideo before allowing the infection to take her and joins the infected hivemind, allowing herself to be consumed by a massive building sized creature, whereupon her more base desires take control and she aids the creature in its attempt to murder Hideo, since he refuses to willingly join the infected. At the last second before devouring him, however, Hiromi's original self fights its way back to the surface and she convinces the creature to let Hideo live, under the pretense of allowing him to suffer more.
 Yabu Oda: A former nurse who was reduced to the role of a sex slave for the group staying at the Gotemba Premium Outlets. She escapes with Hideo and Hiromi, and she understands the significance of Hiromi's condition in potentially understanding and curing the disease. She and Hideo have sex, whereupon she discovers that she is pregnant with the child of one of the men from the outlet. She was subsequently infected by an infant and forced Hiromi to kill her and the child by crushing them in a nearby garbage truck. However, it is revealed after Hiromi joins the infected that she was subconsciously glad that she was allowed to kill Oda, since she was jealous over her and Hideo having sex.
 Kurusu: The main human antagonist. The original Kurusu was a young adult who gained superhuman strength, regeneration, and speed following his infection by his mother, whom he beat to death in an online video to display his powers and how to kill the infected. He rallies disenfranchised youths via a message board to "create a new world". He was assumed to have been killed in a three-way fight with a fellow immune person known as the "Naked Emperor" and a member of his cult named Takeshi, who had gained powers similar to his own and takes over the 'Kurusu' title. He later appears to Hideo after Hideo is partially swallowed by a zombie. The new Kurusu reappears with his cult in Tokyo trying to overthrow a surviving group. 
 Kurusu's cult: Disenfranchised youths who communicate on message boards and worship Kurusu. They mostly stay at home until are recruited by Kurusu himself and survived the outbreak by virtue of being shut-ins.
 Other than the major characters, two characters have been used to display the ZQN epidemic in other parts of the world as they and the people around them fall to the infection. Kazu, Hideo's colleague, experiences the outbreak in Taipei and is infected together with his girlfriend. Jan, a Belgian, went back to Brussels to find his son, where he suddenly lost his memory inexplicably. After travelling around, seeing several zombies and a mutated one, he ends up in the Notre-Dame-de-Lorette, and his fate is left unknown when the church is presumably destroyed by airstrikes as he begins to show signs of infection. Another sidestory follows an immune little girl in Italy who is trapped in a belltower with a group of zombies, only to be rescued by another immune man, who eats the flesh of the infected, and who takes it upon himself to protect and raise the little girl.

Media

Manga
I Am a Hero, written and illustrated by Kengo Hanazawa, was serialized in Shōgakukan's seinen manga magazine Weekly Big Comic Spirits from April 27, 2009, to February 27, 2017. Shogakukan collected its chapters in twenty-two tankōbon volumes, released from August 28, 2009, to March 30, 2017.

In North America, Dark Horse Comics announced in May 2015 the license to the manga for English language release, with plans for a two-in-one omnibus format release starting in 2016. The first volume was published on April 13, 2016. The eleventh and final volume was published on October 23, 2019.

It was also published in Italy by GP Manga, in France by Kana, in Spain by Norma Editorial, in Mexico by Panini Manga, in Germany by Carlsen Manga, and in Indonesia by Level Comics.

Volume list

Spin-offs and other
A spin-off, titled , written and illustrated by Yuuki Honda, was serialized in Shogakukan's Yawaraka Spirits online magazine from January 26 to December 26, 2015. Shogakukan released a compiled tankōbon volume on February 29, 2016. A second spin-off, titled , written and illustrated by Kazuya Fujisawa, was serialized in Yawaraka Spirits from March 24 to August 25, 2016. Shogakukan released a compiled tankōbon volume on February 28, 2017. A third spin-off, titled , written and illustrated by Kensuke Nishida, was serialized in Yawaraka Spirits from March 28 to October 20, 2016. Shogakukan released a compiled tankōbon volume on February 28, 2017.

An anthology series by various manga artists, containing 8 short stories, titled , was serialized in Big Comic Spirits from February 15 to April 4, 2016. The stories were written by Etsuko Mizusawa, Junji Ito, Masakazu Ishiguro, Tarō Nogizaka, Makoto Ojiro, Mengo Yokoyari, Akane Torikai, and Kōji Yoshimoto. Shogakukan published the compiled volume on April 12, 2016.

Live-action film
A live-action film adaptation, directed by Shinsuke Sato and starring Yo Oizumi, Kasumi Arimura and Masami Nagasawa, premiered at the Sitges Film Festival on October 13, 2015, was released commercially on April 23, 2016. The film has been licensed by Funimation, and was released on DVD and Blu-ray on July 24, 2018.

Reception
By November 2015, the manga had 4 million copies in circulation.

I Am a Hero was nominated for the 3rd, 4th, and 5th Manga Taishō awards. The manga won the 58th Shogakukan Manga Award in the General category in 2013. In a list of "10 Great Zombie Manga", Anime News Network'''s Jason Thompson placed I Am a Hero'' at number 1, considering it "probably the greatest zombie manga ever".

References

External links
 
 
 

Action anime and manga
Dark Horse Comics titles
Films directed by Shinsuke Sato
Funimation
Horror anime and manga
Japanese action horror films
Japanese zombie films
Live-action films based on manga
Manga adapted into films
Manga creation in anime and manga
Psychological thriller anime and manga
Seinen manga
Shogakukan manga
Winners of the Shogakukan Manga Award for general manga
Works by Akiko Nogi
Zombies in anime and manga
Zombies in comics
Japanese psychological horror films
Japanese psychological thriller films
Japanese action films